Elizabeth, Lady Coke (née Cecil; 1578 – 3 January 1646), was an English court office holder. She served as lady-in-waiting to the queen consort of England, Anne of Denmark. She was the daughter of Thomas Cecil, 1st Earl of Exeter, and Dorothy Neville, and the granddaughter of William Cecil, 1st Baron Burghley. She was the wife of Sir William Hatton and later of Sir Edward Coke.

Early life 

In 1578, Hatton was born Elizabeth Cecil. Hatton's father was Thomas Cecil, 1st Earl of Exeter her mother was Dorothy Neville (1548–1609). Hatton's maternal grandfather was John Neville, 4th Baron Latimer and her maternal grandmother was Lady Lucy Somerset, daughter of Henry Somerset, 2nd Earl of Worcester and his first wife Lady Margaret Courtenay. Hatton's paternal grandfather was William Cecil, 1st Baron Burghley and her paternal grandmother was Mary Cheke (died February 1543).

Marriages and children
In the early 1590s, Elizabeth married firstly, Sir William Newport alias Hatton (1560–1597), the son of John Newport (d. 1566) of Hunningham, Warwickshire, and his wife, Dorothy Hatton (d. 1566x70), the sister of Elizabeth I's Lord Chancellor, Sir Christopher Hatton. Newport had taken the surname Hatton when his childless uncle, Sir Christopher Hatton, settled his estates on him as his heir. When Sir Christopher Hatton died in 1591, Robert Greene dedicated his A Maiden's Dream to 'The right worshipful, bountiful, and virtuous lady, the Lady Elizabeth Hatton, wife to the right worshipful Sir William Hatton, Knight'.

William Hatton had earlier married, in June 1589, Elizabeth Gawdy, the daughter and heiress of Sir Francis Gawdy (died 1605) and Elizabeth Coningsby, who died soon after the marriage, leaving an only daughter, Frances Hatton (1590–1623), who on 24 February 1605 married Robert Rich, 2nd Earl of Warwick. After the marriage, Frances Hatton's grandfather, Sir Francis Gawdy, broke off relations with her.

After the death of William Hatton on 12 March 1597, and after a failed wooing by Sir Francis Bacon,  Elizabeth married secondly, on 6 November 1598, Sir Edward Coke. The marriage was held at a private house at the wrong time rather than between 8 and 12 in the morning at a church. Subsequently, all involved parties to the marriage were prosecuted for breaching ecclesiastical law and Sir Edward had to sue for a royal pardon.

When King James VI of Scotland set out to claim the English throne after the death of Queen Elizabeth I in 1603, the Cokes immediately began ingratiating themselves with the new monarch and his family. Elizabeth travelled to Scotland to meet the incoming Queen, Anne of Denmark, and it was said that the high-tempered beauty managed to please the withdrawn, strong-willed Queen. Hence, she and her husband were able to hold the affection and trust of the Queen as long as she lived. She petitioned Sir Robert Cecil unsuccessfully for the position of keeper of the queen's jewels and to help dress her.

On 20 August 1613, Anne of Denmark was received at Wells, Somerset. The mayor William Bull hosted a dinner for members of her household including Lady Hatton, Lady Walsingham, and the four maids of honour.

Elizabeth was 26 years younger than her second husband and had a disposition that was hot-tempered and articulate. They were said to be not compatible but at least well-matched. By 1604, Elizabeth's marriage to Sir Edward Coke deteriorated and she was said to have become a formidable character and thorn at her husband's side. They quarrelled over their respective rights to the Hatton estate which Elizabeth had inherited from her first husband: the dispute became so bitter that the King intervened personally to mediate.

Elizabeth had two daughters by her second husband, Frances Coke, Viscountess Purbeck, and Elizabeth Coke (who died unmarried).

Frances Coke was married in 1617 to John Villiers, 1st Viscount Purbeck, the elder brother of King James' favourite, George Villiers, 1st Duke of Buckingham. This was a major cause of marital strife between Elizabeth and her second husband, Edward Coke. Elizabeth opposed the match (presumably because Villiers was generally believed to be insane) and sent her daughter Frances away from Hatton House in Holborn without informing her husband. Her plans were to keep Frances in a rented house with the help of her relatives. Elizabeth placed her daughter with Lady Withipole, daughter of Sir William Cornwallis, where she intended her daughter to be betrothed to Henry de Vere, 18th Earl of Oxford. However, her husband later located their daughter by chance and took her away, keeping her locked up by legal means in various houses of his friends. Then in September 1617, Frances was married at Hampton Court in the presence of the King and Queen to John Villiers. The marriage was a disastrous failure, and, in 1621, Frances eloped with Sir Robert Howard, with whom she lived in an unofficial union for many years.

Elizabeth and her husband were never reconciled: at his funeral she remarked "We shall never see his like again, thanks be to God".

Death and burial
Hatton died on 3 January 1646, and was buried in the parish church of St Andrew Holborn.

Legacy
Hatton left two sums of £100 in her will to be used to buy land in the Parish of Stoke Poges in Buckinghamshire, England. The monies generated to be used for the poor, sickly and impotent in the Parish. It forms part of the Stoke Poges United Charity. In 2023 a new housing development road called Lady Hatton Place in Stoke Poges was named after her.

See also 
 Hatton Garden

References

Additional sources

External links
The Thomas Gray Archive, University of Oxford, letter re wedding of Sir William Hatton 
Longueville, Thomas, The Curious Case of Lady Purbeck: A Scandal of the XVIIth Century, (London: Longmans Green, 1909). Available in the public domain at Project Gutenberg .
 BBC News Report (6 November 2001) on the exhumation of bodies, including that of Elizabeth Hatton, from St Andrew Guild Church, Holborn

1578 births
1646 deaths
16th-century English women
17th-century English women
Household of Anne of Denmark
Daughters of British earls
Wives of knights